St George Coptic Orthodox Church (Coptic:  // transliteration: ti.eklyseya en.remenkimi en.orthodoxos ente fi.ethowab Gewargios) is one of the oldest Coptic Orthodox churches established in North America. It is one of over 200 Coptic Orthodox Churches in the US. The church belongs to Coptic Diocese of Pennsylvania, Maryland, Delaware & West Virginia.

History
St. George Coptic Orthodox Church was the first Coptic Orthodox church established in Pennsylvania, in 1969. It was incorporated in May 1973  with 30 families at the time. Several Coptic Orthodox priests served the congregation in churches of other denominations until 1980, when a building in Conshohocken was purchased. Pope Shenouda III assigned Father Samuel Thabet Samuel to head that church in September 1983, and Father Samuel and his wife and two children left Egypt and moved to Roxborough.

The congregation later bought the current building in Norristown, Pennsylvania. The Greek Revival church was originally built in 1863 for a congregation of the Trinity Evangelical Lutheran Church. The interior was modified so that the building could be used for Coptic Orthodox Liturgies; the exterior, however, retained its architectural style. The building was consecrated in October 1994, by Pope Shenouda III.

The parish had more than one priest in its history. Fr. Angelos Habib Boghdadi served the parish in its early years, as well as several other Coptic churches throughout the States, including St. Mary Coptic Orthodox Church in Ambridge, Pennsylvania. Fr. Boghdadi is currently the priest of St. George Church in Tampa, Florida.

Formative years
During the church's formative years in the 1980s, Fr. Samuel Thabet Samuel was the parish priest. He served until 1990 when summoned by Pope Shenouda III to serve St. Mark Coptic Orthodox Church of Chicago, Illinois , becoming the senior priest. In 1991 Pope Shenouda sent Fr. Roufail Z. Youssef as parish priest. Over 300 Coptic families are served by St. George's Church.

See also
Coptic Orthodox Church
Coptic Orthodox Church in the United States

References

External links

Coptic Orthodox churches in Pennsylvania
Christian organizations established in 1969
1969 establishments in Pennsylvania
Churches completed in 1863
Oriental Orthodox congregations established in the 20th century
Churches in Montgomery County, Pennsylvania
Greek Revival church buildings in Pennsylvania
Norristown, Pennsylvania